The following is a list of notable Middlebury College faculty, including current and former faculty.  For a list of Middlebury alumni, refer to the list of Middlebury College alumni.

Notable faculty

Arts
 Suzanne Bocanegra – Professor of Art
 François Clemmons – Grammy Award-winning singer, Artist-in-residence and Twilight Scholar
 Jason Mittell – Professor of Film and Media Culture
 Patrick McNaughton – art historian, Instructor of Art History
 Su Lian Tan – composer and flautist, Professor of Music

Humanities and literature
 Eve Adler – Professor of Greek, Latin and Hebrew
 Harold Bloom – taught at Bread Loaf School of English
 John Engels – poet, Professor of Literature
 Frank Hugh Foster – Professor of Philosophy
 Robert Frost – Professor of Poetry at Middlebury's Bread Loaf School of English; a major influence on the Bread Loaf Writers' Conference
 John Gardner – taught at Bread Loaf Writers' Conference
 David Huddle – professor of creative writing, poetry and autobiography at Middlebury's Bread Loaf School of English
 John Irving – taught at Bread Loaf Writers' Conference
 Donald Justice – taught at Bread Loaf Writers' Conference
 Toni Morrison – taught at Bread Loaf Writers' Conference
 Howard Nemerov – taught at Bread Loaf Writers' Conference
 G. Dennis O'Brien – Professor of Philosophy, 8th President of the University of Rochester
 Robert Pack – taught English; from 1973 to 1995 served as director of the Bread Loaf Writers' Conference
 Jay Parini – Professor of Literature of Writing, co-founder of the New England Review, author of The Last Station
 John Crowe Ransom – taught at Bread Loaf School of English
 Theodore Roethke – taught at Bread Loaf School of English
 Mark Strand – taught at Bread Loaf Writers' Conference
 William Carlos Williams – taught at Bread Loaf School of English

Languages
 Oskar Seidlin – Professor of German
 Mark R.V. Southern – Professor of German and Linguistics
 Ghil'ad Zuckermann – Professor of Hebrew Linguistics

Natural sciences
 Charles Baker Adams – Professor of Chemistry and Natural History
 Matthew T. Dickerson – Professor of Computer Science, scholar of the fiction of J. R. R. Tolkien and the Inklings
 Anne Kelly Knowles – Professor of Geography
 Ronald D. Liebowitz – 16th President of Middlebury College, former Professor of Geography
 Bill McKibben – American environmentalist and Schumann Distinguished Scholar of Environmental Science
 Reuben D. Mussey – Professor of Medicine
 John S. Rigden – Professor of Physics, former editor of the American Journal of Physics, fellow of the American Association for the Advancement of Science and the National Academy of Sciences
 Frank Winkler – astronomer, Gamaliel Painter Bicentennial Professor of Physics
 Richard Wolfson – Benjamin F. Wissler Professor of Physics

Social sciences
 Nathaniel Chipman – Professor of Law, former United States senator, former federal judge, and former chief justice of Vermont
 David Colander – Christian A. Johnson Distinguished Professor of Economics
 Murray Dry – Charles A. Dana Professor of Political Science
 Paul Monod – Professor of History
 Caitlin Myers - Professor of Economics
 Allison Stanger – Professor of International Politics and Economics
 David Stoll – Professor of Anthropology

Fellows in Residence
 Madeline Kunin – Bicentennial Fellow in Residence and 77th Governor of Vermont

Middlebury Institute of International Studies at Monterey
 Jan Knippers Black – Professor of Human Rights
 Avner Cohen – Professor of Nuclear History and Strategic Policy
 Russell D. Howard – Professor of Counterterrorism and Special Operations
 Pushpa Iyer – Professor of Conflict Analysis and Resolution
 Beryl Levinger – Professor of International Development
 William C. Potter – Professor of Nonproliferation Studies; Director of James Martin Center for Nonproliferation Studies
 Robert Rogowsky – Professor of International Trade and Economic Diplomacy
 Jason Scorse – Professor of Environmental Policy Studies; Director of the Center for Blue Economy

References

External links
 Middlebury College official website
 Middlebury Institute of International Studies at Monterey official website

Middlebury College